The 1902–03 French Rugby Union Championship was won by the Stade Français, winning the final against the Stade Olympiens des étudiants Toulousains (SOET) with a score of 16-8. 

The final was held on April 26th, 1903 at Prairie des filtres in Toulouse and was refereed by Robert Coulon.

Qualification for the final 
The Racing Club was initially positioned to become the champion of Paris (the team representing Paris in the Union Championship), having won against Le Havre A.C, but were disqualified because one of their players was not properly licensed. Subsequently, the Stade Français managed to qualify, by beating Le Havre 14–0.

SOET were the champions of the Garonne Region, qualifying after beating Stade Bordelais (8–3).

First round 

 FC Grenoble beat Union Athlétique de Provence. Following incidents during a match between the Union Athlétique de Provence and Olympique de Marseille, the UAP were disqualified by the USFSA on the 3rd of March.
 FC Lyon beats Chalon 36-0 in Chalon on the February, 22nd

Quarter-finals 

 Toulouse beats Bordeaux 8-3 in Toulouse on the 1st of March
 Le Havre beats Chartres 9-0 at Parc des Princes Stadium on the 8th of March
 FC Lyon beats Grenoble 6-0 in Lyon on the 22nd of March. Despite having already beaten them in a previous match on the 15th of March, FC Lyon and FC Grenoble faced each other again. Due to an error in the previous game, where the referee had forgotten to make the teams switch sides of the field during overtime, an appeal had been issued for a rematch by Grenoble.

Semi-finals 

 Toulouse beats FC Lyon 3-0 on the 29th of March at Parc des Princes Stadium
 Stade Français beats Le Havre 14-0 in Le Havre on the 5th of April

Final 

Two of the students from SOET, Albert Cuillé and Augustin Pujol later played for Stade Français in the final in 1906.

External links
 Compte rendu de la finale de 1903, sur lnr.fr

1903
France
Championship